Takashi Nishida (born 24 January 1976) is a Japanese snowboarder. He competed in the men's halfpipe event at the 1998 Winter Olympics.

References

1976 births
Living people
Japanese male snowboarders
Olympic snowboarders of Japan
Snowboarders at the 1998 Winter Olympics
Place of birth missing (living people)
20th-century Japanese people